Charles Workman Maclay FRCS, FRCSED, FRFPSGLAS (4 November 1913 – 12 April 1978) was a Scottish anatomist and consultant surgeon.

Early life
Maclay was born in Glasgow and educated at Glasgow Academy and Strathallan School, Perthshire.  At the University of Glasgow he was awarded the Lorimer bursary in anatomy and physiology,
the Macleod gold medal in surgery, and the Asher Asher gold medal in diseases of the ear, nose, and throat.  Maclay graduated BSc in 1933, MB ChB in 1936, and became FRCS Edinburgh in 1940, FRCS England in 1941 and FRFPS Glasgow in 1943.  In 1937, one year after graduation, he became senior demonstrator and lecturer in anatomy at King's College, University of London.

Surgeon
At the outbreak of World War II in 1939, Maclay joined the Royal Army Medical Corps and served as a surgical specialist.  On 18 December 1943, he was promoted to lieutenant.  Maclay was one of those who took part in the Normandy landings on 6 June 1944.  In 1947 he was demobilised with the permanent rank of major.  During these years and later, Maclay contributed papers to medical and scientific journals.

Maclay was appointed consultant surgeon to the Boston Combined Hospitals, Lincolnshire in 1948.  Driven by an urge to help underprivileged people, he emigrated to South Africa in 1957, where he was senior surgeon at Butterworth, Port Elizabeth and Eshowe hospitals.  He was proficient in French and German, had a knowledge of Italian and Afrikaans and over time developed an ability in certain African languages.

In 1964 Maclay became senior lecturer in anatomy at the Durban Medical School, University of Natal. He accepted the same position at the University of Cape Town in 1970, before returning to the University of Natal in 1974.  Maclay evolved a series of diagrams for teaching gross anatomy, neuroanatomy, embryology and a masterpiece of concise instruction in applied anatomy.

References

1913 births
1978 deaths
Medical doctors from Glasgow
People educated at the Glasgow Academy
People educated at Strathallan School
Alumni of the University of Glasgow
Scottish anatomists
Scottish surgeons
Royal Army Medical Corps officers
British Army personnel of World War II
Scottish scholars and academics
Academics of King's College London
Academic staff of the University of Natal
Academic staff of the University of Cape Town
Fellows of the Royal College of Surgeons
Fellows of the Royal College of Surgeons of Edinburgh
Fellows of the Royal College of Physicians and Surgeons of Glasgow
20th-century Scottish medical doctors
Scottish expatriates in South Africa
20th-century surgeons